Ademola Adeshina (born 4 June 1964) is a former Nigeria international football midfielder. He is currently the technical advisor of Nigeria National League team Prime F.C.

Career
Born in Nigeria, Adeshina played club football for local sides Abiola Babes and Shooting Stars F.C., before a brief spell in Belgium with Sporting Lokeren.

Adeshina represented Nigeria at the 1988 Summer Olympics in Seoul. He also made several appearances for the senior Nigeria national football team, including five FIFA World Cup qualifying matches, and he played at the 1984 and 1988 and 1990 African Cup of Nations finals.

References

External links

1964 births
Living people
Yoruba sportspeople
Nigerian footballers
Nigeria international footballers
Olympic footballers of Nigeria
Footballers at the 1988 Summer Olympics
1982 African Cup of Nations players
1984 African Cup of Nations players
1988 African Cup of Nations players
1990 African Cup of Nations players
Shooting Stars S.C. players
K.S.C. Lokeren Oost-Vlaanderen players
Nigerian expatriate footballers
Expatriate footballers in Belgium
Association football midfielders
Abiola Babes F.C. players